Pierre-Henri Simon (16 January 1903, Saint-Fort-sur-Gironde – 20 September 1972) was a French intellectual, literary historian, essayist, novelist, poet, and literary critic.  He won the Prix Ève Delacroix in 1963

Works

Essays
 Destins de la personne, 1935
 L'Église et la Révolution sociale, 1938
 L'homme en procès: Malraux, Sartre, Camus, Saint-Exupéry (1950)
 L'Europe a-t-elle une conscience ?, 1953
 Contre la torture, 1957 (Pamphlet)
 Ce que je crois, 1966

Novels
 Les Valentin, 1931
 L'Affût, 1946
 Les Raisins verts, 1950
 Celle qui est née un dimanche, 1952
 Les Hommes ne veulent pas mourir, 1953
 Portrait d'un officier, 1958
 Le Somnambule, 1960
 Histoire d'un bonheur, 1965
 Pour un garçon de vingt ans, 1967
 Questions aux savants, 1969
 La Sagesse du soir, 1971
 L'Homme et sa Vérité, 1972

Literary criticism
 Georges Duhamel ou le Bourgeois sauvé, 1947
 Mauriac par lui-même, 1953
 Histoire de la Littérature française du XXe siècle, 1956
 Théâtre et Destin, 1959
 Présence de Camus, 1961
 Le Domaine héroïque des lettres françaises, 1963

Theatre
 Le Ballet de Modène, 1968

1903 births
1972 deaths
People from Charente-Maritime
French literary historians
French literary critics
Members of the Académie Française
20th-century French novelists
20th-century French poets
20th-century French historians
French male essayists
French male poets
French male novelists
20th-century French essayists
20th-century French male writers